The 2014 Extraordinary Federal Congress of the Spanish Socialist Workers' Party was held in Madrid from 26 to 27 July 2014, to renovate the governing bodies of the Spanish Socialist Workers' Party (PSOE) and establish the party's main lines of action and strategy for the next leadership term. A primary election to elect the new party secretary-general was held on 13 July. The congress was called by outgoing PSOE leader Alfredo Pérez Rubalcaba after his party's poor results at the 2014 European Parliament election, garnering just 23% of the vote. Rubalcaba announced his intention not to run for either his party's leadership or for the 2015 Spanish general election.

Election system
This Federal Congress was the first held at a national level in which all party members and affiliates (around 200,000) had the possibility to be consulted, several days before the Congress was held, about which person they wanted to become the new party leader. While not a legally binding ballot, the results were likely to be respected by the 1,000 party delegates which finally elected the new party's Secretary-General. Party members wishing to contend the election were required to gather the endorsement of at least 5% of the party membership before June 27.

Background
The 2011 general election had resulted in a landslide victory for Mariano Rajoy's People's Party (PP), a result of the financial crisis which had been hurting the country's economy since 2008. The ruling Spanish Socialist Workers' Party (PSOE), amidst a climate of high unpopularity, was ousted from power with the worst election result since the first post-Francoist electoral process in 1977. Then-Prime Minister José Luis Rodríguez Zapatero had decided to stand down as PM candidate in early 2011 and as party leader once the quadrennial party congress due for early 2012 was held. Alfredo Pérez Rubalcaba, PSOE candidate for the 2011 election and former Deputy Prime Minister, was elected new Secretary-General in a tight fight against former Minister of Defence Carme Chacón.

However, as the new Rajoy's government was forced to pass new austerity measures and spending cuts, including a harsh labor reform and a very austere state budget for 2012, the new Government's ratings plummeted in opinion polls as it met with widespread protests and two general strikes. Little over 6 months of government had seen support for the PP government plummet from 45% in the general election to 34% in mid-to late 2012 polls, the most support lost by a political party in its first months of government in the country's history.

However, despite the PP's falling ratings, the PSOE found itself unable to regain lost support, suffering from the memory on Zapatero's last government and his economic management, as well as the emergence of major corruption scandals in both parties, regarding possible illegal financing on both the People's Party and the Socialist Party regional government of Andalusia. A series of negative regional election results throughout 2012, coupled with an internal crisis in 2013 and the threat of rupture from the party's Catalonia partner, the PSC, further weakened the PSOE, with Rubalcaba's leadership being put in question as his popularity ratings plummeted. The crisis was temporarily settled after the party's Political Conference in November 2013, with the question on the party's leadership being initially postponed for late 2014.

After the European Parliament election, 2014 culminated in a major election crash for the party, coupled with a spectacular rise in support for newly-created Podemos party, Alfredo Pérez Rubalcaba announced his intention not to run as his party's candidate for the 2015 general election and to have the party hold an extraordinary Congress for July 2014.

Timetable
The key dates are listed below:

26 May: Official announcement and census closure.
6–9 June: Communication of provisional census and period of correction of census incidents.
10 June: Communication of definitive census.
10–13 June: Presentation of pre-candidates.
13–28 June: Endorsement collection period (until 27 June) and provisional candidate proclamations.
29 June–2 July: Allegation and definitive candidate proclamations.
3–12 July: Information campaign.
13 July: Primary election (to elect the Secretary-General).
13–19 July: Provincial and insular congresses. Election of delegates and amendment period.
26–27 July: Extraordinary Federal Congress.

Candidates

Declined
The individuals in this section were the subject of speculation about their possible candidacy, but publicly denied or recanted interest in running:

Carme Chacón (age ) — Deputy in the Cortes Generales for Barcelona (2000–2013); Minister of Defence of Spain (2008–2011); Minister of Housing of Spain (2007–2008); First Vice President of the Congress of Deputies (2004–2007); Secretary of Education, Universities, Culture and Research of the PSOE (2000–2004); First Deputy Mayor of Esplugues de Llobregat (1999–2003); City Councillor of Esplugues de Llobregat (1999–2003).
Susana Díaz (age ) — President of the Regional Government of Andalusia (since 2013); Secretary General of the PSOE–A (since 2013); Deputy in the Parliament of Andalusia for Seville (since 2008); Minister of the Presidency and Equality of Andalusia (2012–2013); Secretary General of the PSOE–A in Seville (2012–2013); Senator in the Cortes Generales appointed by the Parliament of Andalusia (2011–2012); Secretary of Organization of the PSOE–A (2010–2012); Secretary of Organization of the PSOE–A in Seville (2004–2010); Deputy in the Cortes Generales for Seville (2004–2008); Deputy Mayor for Human Resources in Seville (2003–2004); City Councillor of Seville (1999–2004); Secretary of Organization of the JSA (1997–2004).
Emiliano García-Page (age ) — Senator in the Cortes Generales appointed by the Cortes of Castilla–La Mancha (since 2011); Mayor of Toledo (since 2007); City Councillor of Toledo (1987–1993 and since 2007); Secretary-General of the PSCM–PSOE in Toledo (since 1997); Second Vice President of the Junta of Communities of Castilla–La Mancha (2005–2007); Deputy in the Cortes of Castilla–La Mancha for Toledo (1995–2007); Regional Minister of Institutional Relations of Castilla–La Mancha (2004–2005); Spokesperson of the Government of Castilla–La Mancha (1993–1997, 1998–1999 and 2001–2004); Spokesperson of the PSOE Group in the Cortes of Castilla–La Mancha (2000–2001); Regional Minister of Social Welfare of Castilla–La Mancha (1999–2000); Regional Minister of Public Works of Castilla–La Mancha (1997–1998); Deputy Mayor for Celebrations of Toledo (1991–1993).
Patxi López (age ) — Secretary of Political Relations of the PSOE (since 2012); Secretary General of the PSE–EE (PSOE) (since 2002); Deputy in the Basque Parliament for Biscay and Álava (since 1991); Lehendakari (2009–2012); Leader of the Opposition in the Basque Parliament (2005–2009); Secretary General of the PSE–EE (PSOE) in Biscay (1997–2002); Secretary of Organization of the PSE–EE (PSOE) (1991–1995); Deputy in the Cortes Generales for Biscay (1987–1989); Secretary General of the JSE–EGAZ (1985–1988).
Alfredo Pérez Rubalcaba (age ) — Secretary General of the PSOE and Leader of the Opposition (since 2012); Deputy in the Cortes Generales for Toledo, Madrid, Cantabria and Cádiz (since 1993); First Deputy Prime Minister of Spain (2010–2011); Spokesperson of the Government (1993–1996 and 2010–2011); Minister of the Interior of Spain (2006–2011); Spokesperson of the PSOE Group in the Congress of Deputies (2004–2006); Secretary of Communication of the PSOE (1997–2000); Minister of the Presidency of Spain (1993–1996); Minister of Education and Science of Spain (1992–1993); Secretary of State of Education of Spain (1986–1992).

Endorsements
Candidates seeking to run were required to collect the endorsements of at least 5% of party members.

Opinion polls
Poll results are listed in the tables below in reverse chronological order, showing the most recent first, and using the date the survey's fieldwork was done, as opposed to the date of publication. If such date is unknown, the date of publication is given instead. The highest percentage figure in each polling survey is displayed in bold, and the background shaded in the candidate's colour. In the instance of a tie, the figures with the highest percentages are shaded. Polls show data gathered among PSOE voters/supporters as well as Spanish voters as a whole, but not among party members, who were the ones ultimately entitled to vote in the primary election.

PSOE voters

Spanish voters

Results

Overall

By region

Aftermath
In his victory speech after being elected as Secretary-General by party members, Pedro Sánchez proclaimed "the beginning of a new time in the Spanish Socialist Workers' Party" and that it was "the beginning of the end of Mariano Rajoy [as Prime Minister]". He was formally named to the post on 26 July succeeding Rubalcaba, who announced his intention to quit from active politics and to return to his post professor in the Organic Chemistry faculty, in the Complutense University of Madrid.

Upon his official proclamation as Secretary-General, Sánchez stated that "We [the PSOE] are the party of change, we are the left that will change Spain", urging all Socialists to "work for the millions of people that need a renewed PSOE" and to make the party "the most formidable instrument for making the country progress". Sánchez promised to be blunt with corruption cases within the party, to look forward the promotion of a federal amendment of the Spanish Constitution and that his Executive will report in an open assembly to the militants once per year. Sánchez stated that he was inspired by the "modernization drives" of both Felipe González in the past as well as of PD-leader Matteo Renzi in Italy.

Notes

References
Opinion poll sources

Other

PSOE Congresses
2014 in Spain
Political party leadership elections in Spain
PSOE leadership election